Robert Gerald Mondavi (June 18, 1913 – May 16, 2008) was an American winemaker. His technical and marketing strategies brought worldwide recognition for the wines of the Napa Valley in California. From an early period, Mondavi promoted labeling wines varietally rather than generically, which became the standard for New World wines. The Robert Mondavi Institute (RMI) for Wine and Food Science at the University of California, Davis opened in October 2008 in his honor.

Family history
Robert Mondavi's parents, Cesare Mondavi and Rosa Grassi, emigrated from Sassoferrato in the Marche region of Italy and settled in Hibbing, Minnesota. Robert Gerald Mondavi was born in Virginia, Minnesota. From Minnesota the Mondavi family moved to Lodi, California, where he attended Lodi High School. In Lodi, his father, Cesare, established a fruit packing business under the name C. Mondavi and Sons, packing and shipping grapes to the east coast primarily for home winemaking. Mondavi graduated from Stanford University in 1937 with a degree in economics and business administration. While at Stanford he was a member of the Phi Sigma Kappa fraternity.

In 1943, Mondavi joined his father and brother Peter after the family acquired the Charles Krug Winery located in St. Helena, California, from James Moffitt.
In 1965, Robert Mondavi left the family winery after a feud with his younger brother Peter over the business direction of the Krug Winery. Subsequently, Mondavi started his own winery in Oakville, California. The Robert Mondavi Winery is located on Highway 29 between Oakville and Rutherford (though its corporate headquarters are in nearby St. Helena.)

In 1966, he founded the Robert Mondavi Winery, the first major winery built in Napa Valley in the post-Prohibition era. Part of Mondavi's original vineyard land included the To Kalon (a Greek term meaning "the beautiful") vineyard originally established by Napa Valley pioneer H.W. Crabb in 1868. The winery produced wine in the California mission style. Mondavi selected Cliff May to design the winery building, which opened in 1966 and is now considered an architectural icon in the Napa Valley, with an expansive entryway arch and bell tower.

Family
In 1937, Mondavi married his high school sweetheart, Marjorie Ellen (Declusin) Mondavi. Together, the couple had three children: Michael, Marcia, and Tim. In the late 1970s, their marriage ended in a divorce. In 1980, at the age of 67, he married Margrit (Kellenberger) Biever Mondavi, a Swiss-born, and multilingual woman who worked at the Robert Mondavi winery.

Wine history

In 1968, Mondavi made a dry oak–aged Sauvignon blanc, an unpopular variety in California at the time, and labeled it "Fumé Blanc". The name Fumé Blanc became accepted as a synonym for Sauvignon blanc.

Mondavi entered into a joint venture with Baron Philippe de Rothschild of Château Mouton Rothschild to create Opus One Winery, and since the 1990s has set up joint ventures with local partners in Europe, South America and Australia.

In the Grand European Jury Wine Tasting of 1997, the Robert Mondavi Chardonnay Reserve was ranked number one.

In 2005, Robert Mondavi and his younger brother Peter made wine together for the first time after their feud. Using grapes from both family vineyards, they produced one barrel of cabernet blend, which was sold for $400,000 under the name "Ancora Una Volta" ("Once Again") at the 2005 Napa Valley Auction. All the money earned from the barrel of wine went to charity.

Legacy
In 2003, Mondavi expressed regret and criticized his sons for the business strategy that emphasized the inexpensive Mondavi lines, Coastal and Woodbridge, over the premium wines, allowing the company name to lose its association with fine wine it held in the past. He said, "We've got to get our image back, and that's going to take time."

In the 2004 documentary film Mondovino, the Mondavi family featured prominently, in close application to its theme of globalization. At the time, the Mondavis had recently acquired the Italian "cult wine" Ornellaia winery, Tenuta Dell'Ornellaia.

On December 22, 2004, Constellation Brands acquired the Mondavi winery in a controversial takeover for nearly US$1.36 billion in cash and assumption of debt. Following the sale of the company, Mondavi partnered with his younger son Tim Mondavi and daughter Marcia Mondavi to make a single wine from a single estate at the highest level. The family partnership Continuum Estate is still run by the family. 

In 2001, Robert Mondavi donated $10 million to help with the building cost of the Robert and Margrit Mondavi Center for the Performing Arts building at UC Davis.  The Mondavi Center was opened on October 3, 2002. Robert also donated $25 million to establish the Robert Mondavi Institute for Wine and Food Science and this opened a new era for UC Davis’s wine and food programs. It was the largest private contribution to UC Davis.

The two were founders and major benefactors behind the museum Copia, which opened November 2001 in the city of Napa, California.

Robert and Margrit were also founding supporters of the restoration of the 19th-century Napa Valley Opera House and the Oxbow School, a new art school in Napa that provides grants and instruction to art students in their junior year of high school. They have contributed to the restoration of the Lincoln Theatre in Yountville, California, and have supported the Cantor Arts Center at Stanford University in Palo Alto, California.

Death
Robert Mondavi died at his Yountville home on May 16, 2008 at the age of 94.

Published works

Awards and honors 
In 1985, Mondavi received the Golden Plate Award of the American Academy of Achievement.

Robert Mondavi was selected as the Decanter "Man of the Year" in 1989. 
He was inducted into the Junior Achievement U.S. Business Hall of Fame in 1991.

In 2000 he was awarded Doctor of Oenology, Honoris Causa, by the Board of Trustees of Johnson & Wales University.

In 2002, he received the Order of Merit of the Italian Republic. In 2005, he received the Legion of Honour from the French government.

On December 5, 2007, California Governor Arnold Schwarzenegger and First Lady Maria Shriver inducted Mondavi into the California Hall of Fame, located at The California Museum for History, Women and the Arts.

He was inducted into the Culinary Institute of America Vintner's Hall of Fame in 2007. The election was based upon ballots from seventy wine journalists. The decision for their election of Mondavi is for contributions to the wine industry of California during his lifetime.

Robert Mondavi was awarded the Presidential Gold Medal of the Confrerie de la Chaine des Rotisseurs in December 2006 for his many contributions to the Society.

See also

 List of wine personalities
 Sena wine

Further reading

References

External links
 Robert Mondavi official site
 Napa Valley Wine Co. the story and historical documents re. Charles Krug, Jacob Beringer/Beringer Bros., and Cesare/Robert Mondavi (in German)
 Robert G. Mondavi Papers at Special Collections Dept., University Library, University of California, Davis
 

1913 births
2008 deaths
20th-century American businesspeople
21st-century American businesspeople
American people of Italian descent
American viticulturists
American winemakers
James Beard Foundation Award winners
Lodi High School (California) alumni
People from Lodi, California
People from Virginia, Minnesota
People from Yountville, California
Recipients of the Legion of Honour
Recipients of the Order of Merit of the Italian Republic
Stanford University alumni
Wine merchants